The Mawangdui Silk Texts are Chinese philosophical and medical works written on silk which were discovered at the Mawangdui site in Changsha, Hunan, in 1973. They include some of the earliest attested manuscripts of existing texts (such as the I Ching), two copies of the Tao Te Ching, a copy of Zhan Guo Ce, works by Gan De and Shi Shen and previously unknown medical texts, such as Wushi'er Bingfang (Prescriptions for Fifty-Two Ailments). Scholars arranged them into 28 types of silk books. Their approximately 120,000 words cover military strategy, mathematics, cartography and the six classical arts: ritual, music, archery, horsemanship, writing and arithmetic.

Overview

The texts were buried in tomb number three at Mawangdui (which was sealed in 168 BC), and were hidden until their late-20th-century discovery. Some were previously known only by title, and others are previously unknown commentaries on the I Ching attributed to Confucius. In general, they follow the same sequence as the received versions, which were passed down by copying and recopying texts collected and collated during the fifth century AD. However, in some important aspects they differ noticeably from the received texts known before their discovery.

The Chinese characters in the silk texts are often only fragments of the characters used in later traditional versions. Many characters are formed by combining two simpler characters: one indicating a general category of meaning, and the other to guide pronunciation. Where the traditional texts have both components, the silk texts frequently give only the phonetic half of the character. There are several hypotheses to explain this:
 The scribe may have been too lazy to write the full form of many characters.
 The earlier of two silk texts (or the text from which it was copied) may have been a scribe taking dictation as quickly as they could write. The scribe wrote down the part of each character that indicates its pronunciation, with the intention of later recopying the text with the appropriate meaning components for the abbreviated characters.
 In English, "dog" has two apparently-unrelated meanings: a carnivorous mammal, or to pursue with unflagging patience. English speakers do not write "dog (the mammal)", even in the sentence "The feral dog dogged the human invaders of its territory until they eventually left the area". A similar understanding may have been assumed in the ancient writings.
 It may have been a form of jargon; similar writing of partial characters are found in ancient Chinese musical (pipa, guqin and guzheng) scores. Partial characters and their derivatives are building blocks for the writing systems of some historical (such as Khitan and Tangut) and modern languages, such as Japanese.

In addition to partial characters mentioned above, the two-silk texts sometimes use characters different from those in later versions. This is similar to the English "She flowered the table" compared with "She floured the table", and the older version provides insight into a text's original meaning.

Tao Te Ching
Most received versions of the Tao Te Ching are in substantial agreement, and most text is simple and straightforward. Occasionally two versions will have a homonym, and a third text with a character which is a synonym for one of the first two characters is useful.

D. C. Lau and Robert G. Henricks have made new translations of the Tao Te Ching based on the silk text, largely ignoring the received texts, although Henricks' translation compares received versions with the text found in the tomb. In 1990, sinologist Victor H. Mair translated the Ma-wang-tui version; Mair considered this earliest-known version (by 500 years) more authentic than the most-commonly-translated texts. The two silk books are part of the Cultural Relics from the Mawangdui Tombs collection at the Hunan Provincial Museum.

Translations

See also
 Book of Silk
 Chu Silk Manuscript
 Guodian Chu Slips
 Mawangdui
 Shuanggudui
 Shuihudi Qin bamboo texts
 Yinqueshan Han Slips
 Zhangjiashan Han bamboo texts

References

168 BC
2nd-century BC manuscripts
1973 archaeological discoveries
Archaeological corpora
Archaeological artifacts of China
Chinese classic texts
Chinese manuscripts
History of Changsha
Han dynasty texts
Silk